Albosaggia is a comune (municipality) in the Province of Sondrio in the Italian region Lombardy, located about  northeast of Milan and about  southwest of Sondrio.

Albosaggia borders the following municipalities: Caiolo, Castione Andevenno, Faedo Valtellino, Montagna in Valtellina, Piateda, Sondrio.

Demographic evolution

References

External links
 www.comune.albosaggia.so.it

Cities and towns in Lombardy
Articles which contain graphical timelines